Sa'd II was the Salghurid atabeg (ruler) of Fars briefly in 1260. While he was returning from an attendance with the Ilkhanate, his father Abu Bakr ibn Sa'd died. Sa'd II thus succeeded him, but died en route at Tafresh due to illness. He was succeeded by his young son Muhammad I ibn Sa'd.

References

Sources 
 
 

1260 deaths
13th-century Turkic people
Salghurids